Kalpabiswa is an online Bengali language science fiction literary magazine. It is the first and biggest online sci-fi magazine published in Bengali language. It is the main Bengali sci-fi web magazine. Notable Bengali fiction writers like Adrish Bardhan, Ranen Ghosh, Yashodhara Ray Chaudhuri, Anish Deb and Amitananda Das have contributed for the magazine.

Kalpabiswa Publications

From 2017, Kalpabiswa started to publish E-books of notable Bengali language books as well as the magazine itself. From 2018, Kalpabiswa started its own Hardboard and Paperback publishing house named Kalpabiswa Publication. With the 200 years of creation of Mary Shelley's Frankenstein, Kalpabiswa has published Frankenstein 200, an anthology of Frankenstein themed fictions and non fictions, as a tribute. The book was launched at the campus of Jadavpur University during the first International Conference on science fiction held in Kolkata.

Notable books
Kaalsandarva by Ankita (2018)
Kalpabiswa: Upanyash Parba 1 (2018)
Frankenstein 200 (2018)
Siddhartha Ghosh Rachana Sangraha (2019)
Siddhartha Ghosh Rachana Sangraha 2 (2020)
Sera Aschorjyo Sera Fantastic (2019)
Sabuj Manush (2019)
Arthotrishna by Sumit Bardhan (2019)
Nakkhatra Pathik by Sumit Bardhan (2020)
Kalpabigyan Samagra by Rebanta Goswami (2020)
Decagon by Riju Ganguly (2020)
Manan Shil by Partha De (2020)
Swamohimay Sanku by Satyajit Ray and Sudip Deb (2020)

Aschorjyo and Bismoy Science fiction awards 
From 2023, Kalpabiswa Publication and Pratisruti are sponsoring the only science fiction awards in Bengali. The Aschorjyo award, given for considerable contribution to Kalpabigyan is given by Kalpabiswa. The Bismoy science fiction award is given to the best newcomer in the field of Kalpabigyan by Pratisruti.

Awards and Recognitions
Oxford Bookstore Book Cover Prize (2022) for Kankabati Kalpabigyan Lekheni, Edited by Yashodhara Ray Chaudhuri, Ankita and Dip Ghosh, designed by Ujjwal Ghosh

References

External links
Official Kalpabiswa Patrika site

Indian science fiction
Science fiction magazines
Bengali-language little magazines